Sheridan Square Apartments is a historic apartment building at 620-638 Sheridan Square in Evanston, Illinois. The three-story brick building was built in 1924. The building has an S-shaped layout which wraps around a corner and features an open courtyard. Architect Anthony Quitsow designed the building in the Tudor Revival style. The building's design features Gothic arched entrances, French windows with limestone spandrels, limestone banding near the roof, and several double gables facing the street.

The building was added to the National Register of Historic Places on March 15, 1984.

References

External links

Buildings and structures on the National Register of Historic Places in Cook County, Illinois
Residential buildings on the National Register of Historic Places in Illinois
Buildings and structures in Evanston, Illinois
Apartment buildings in Illinois
Tudor Revival architecture in Illinois
Residential buildings completed in 1924